Tominian is a small town and commune and capital of the Cercle of Tominian in the Ségou Region of Mali. In 1998 the commune had a population of 18,130. In 2004, the population in the main town was recorded at 3,119 people.

As of 2004 the mayor is Bourema Diassana.

Gallery
At a kind of festival in Tominian in 1972 various groups of dancers, musicians and singers performed. These were dancers with a singer representing Tominian itself:

The group for neighbouring Ké-Macina:

And finally the group representing Ségou:

References

Communes of Ségou Region